Point Zero may refer to:

Point Zero (band), now known as War of Ages
Point Zero Games, a publisher of the Army of Zero card game
Asahi Point Zero, a non-alcoholic beer
Kilometre zero, a road distance point

See also
Zero point (disambiguation)